Robert Lester Floyd (January 4, 1918 – May 14, 2007) was a U.S. politician best known as the youngest mayor of the City of Miami.

Floyd was born on January 4, 1918, in Cincinnati, Ohio, to Paul Leslie Floyd and Margaret Scott and moved to Miami as a child with his mother.  He graduated from Miami High School and earned a degree from the University of Florida.  In 1939, he began to work as a special agent for the FBI in Washington, D.C., while attending law school at American University.  He earned his law degree in 1941 and left the FBI in 1943.  He returned to Miami went into private practice.  On September 4, 1946, he married Rose Marie Norcross and they had four children, James, Robert II, Edward and Rosemarie.  At his death he also had seven grandchildren.

In 1947, he ran for Mayor of the City of Miami and won at the age of 29. Upon his election, he was the city's first-ever Democratic mayor.  He served as Commissioner of the City of Miami. In 1951 and 1953, he was elected to the Florida House of Representatives. In 1954 and 1960, he was elected as a Dade County court judge.  In 1966, he served for one month as interim Dade County Sheriff before returning to private practice.

He died in Miami in 2007 at the age of 89.

References

 THE MIAMI HERALD, May 16, 2007, page 5B

1918 births
2007 deaths
American people of Welsh descent
Mayors of Miami
University of Florida alumni
Florida lawyers
20th-century American politicians
20th-century American lawyers
Miami Senior High School alumni